In mathematics, comparison theorems are theorems whose statement involves comparisons between various mathematical objects of the same type, and often occur in fields such as calculus, differential equations and Riemannian geometry.

Differential equations

In the theory of differential equations, comparison theorems assert particular properties of solutions of a differential equation (or of a system thereof), provided that an auxiliary equation/inequality (or a system thereof) possesses a certain property.

Chaplygin inequality
Grönwall's inequality, and its various generalizations, provides a comparison principle for the solutions of first-order ordinary differential equations.
Sturm comparison theorem
Aronson and Weinberger used a comparison theorem to characterize solutions to Fisher's equation, a reaction--diffusion equation.
Hille-Wintner comparison theorem

Riemannian geometry
In Riemannian geometry, it is a traditional name for a number of theorems that compare various metrics and provide various estimates in Riemannian geometry. 

Rauch comparison theorem relates the sectional curvature of a Riemannian manifold to the rate at which its geodesics spread apart.
 Toponogov's theorem
Myers's theorem
Hessian comparison theorem
Laplacian comparison theorem
Morse–Schoenberg comparison theorem
Berger comparison theorem, Rauch–Berger comparison theorem
Berger–Kazdan comparison theorem
Warner comparison theorem for lengths of N-Jacobi fields (N being a submanifold of a complete Riemannian manifold)
Bishop–Gromov inequality, conditional on a lower bound for the Ricci curvatures
Lichnerowicz comparison theorem
Eigenvalue comparison theorem
Cheng's eigenvalue comparison theorem
 See also: Comparison triangle

Other
Limit comparison theorem, about convergence of series
Comparison theorem for integrals, about convergence of integrals 
Zeeman's comparison theorem, a technical tool from the theory of spectral sequences

References

Mathematical theorems